The Bowen ratio is used to describe the type of heat transfer for a surface that has moisture.  Heat transfer can either occur as sensible heat (differences in temperature without evapotranspiration) or latent heat (the energy required during a change of state, without a change in temperature).  The Bowen ratio is generally used to calculate heat lost (or gained) in a substance; it is the ratio of energy fluxes from one state to another by sensible heat and latent heating respectively.

The ratio was named by Harald Sverdrup after Ira Sprague Bowen (1898–1973), an astrophysicist whose theoretical work on evaporation to air from water bodies made first use of it, and it is used most commonly in meteorology and hydrology.

Formulation
The Bowen ratio is calculated by the equation: 

As , however,  becomes unbounded making the Bowen ratio a poor choice of variable for use in formulae, especially for arid surfaces. For this reason the evaporative fraction is sometimes a more appropriate choice of variable representing the relative contributions of the turbulent energy fluxes to the surface energy budget.

The Bowen ratio is related to the evaporative fraction, through the equation,

 .

The Bowen ratio is an indicator of the type of surface. The Bowen ratio, is less than one over surfaces with abundant water supplies.

References

External links
 National Science Digital Library - Bowen Ratio

1926 introductions
Engineering ratios
Heat transfer
Atmospheric thermodynamics